Track ballast forms the trackbed upon which railroad ties (sleepers) are laid. It is packed between, below, and around the ties.  It is used to bear the load from the railroad ties, to facilitate drainage of water, and also to keep down vegetation that might interfere with the track structure. Ballast also holds the track in place as the trains roll over it. A variety of materials have been used as track ballast, including crushed stone, washed gravel, bank run (unwashed) gravel, torpedo gravel (a mixture of coarse sand and small gravel), slag, chats, coal cinders, sand, and burnt clay. The term "ballast" comes from a nautical term for the stones used to stabilize a ship.

Construction
The appropriate thickness of a layer of track ballast depends on the size and spacing of the ties, the amount of traffic on the line, and various other factors. An insufficient depth of ballast causes overloading of the underlying soil, and in unfavourable conditions, overloading the soil causes the track to sink, usually unevenly. However, increasing the depth beyond  confers no extra benefit in reducing vibration.

In turn, track ballast typically rests on a layer of small crushed stones: the sub-ballast. The sub-ballast layer gives a solid support for the top ballast, and reduces the ingress of water from the underlying ground. Sometimes an elastic mat is placed on the layer of sub-ballast and beneath the ballast, thereby significantly reducing vibration.

It is essential for ballast to be piled as high as the ties, and for a substantial "shoulder" to be placed at their ends. The latter is especially important, because the ballast shoulder is the main restraint to lateral movement of the track.

The shape of the ballast is also important. Stones must be irregular, with sharp edges. That ensures they properly interlock with each other and the ties so as to fully secure them against movement. Spherical stones cannot do that. In order to let new ballast fully settle and interlock, speed limits are often reduced for a period of time on sections of track where fresh ballast has been laid.

Maintenance

If ballast is badly fouled, the clogging will reduce its ability to drain properly. That, in turn, causes debris to be sucked up from the sub-ballast, causing more fouling. Therefore, keeping the ballast clean is essential. The principal cause of ballast fouling is "fines"—tiny powder-like particles abraded from the ballast material itself. Spillage of coal or other material onto the track can also contribute. 

It is not always necessary to replace the ballast if it is fouled, nor must all the ballast be removed if it is to be cleaned. Removing and cleaning the ballast from the shoulder is often sufficient, if shoulder ballast is removed to the correct depth. While that job was done historically by manual labour, that process is now, as with many other railway maintenance tasks, a mechanised one, with a chain of specially-designed railroad cars handling the task. One wagon cuts (digs up) the ballast and passes it via a conveyor belt to a cleaning machine, which washes the ballast and deposits the dirt and ballast into other wagons for disposal or re-use. Bioremediation can also be used to clean ballast.

Cleaning, however, can only be done a certain number of times before the ballast is damaged to the point that it cannot be re-used. Furthermore, track ballast that is completely fouled can not be corrected by shoulder cleaning. In such cases, it is necessary to replace the ballast altogether. One method of "replacing" ballast, if necessity demands, is to simply dump fresh ballast on the track, jack the whole track on top of it, and then tamp it down. Alternatively, the ballast underneath the track can be removed with an undercutter, which does not require removing or lifting the track.

The dump and jack method cannot be used through tunnels, under bridges, or where there are platforms. Where the track is laid over a swamp, such as the Hexham swamp in Australia, the ballast is likely to sink continuously, and needs to be "topped up" to maintain its line and level. After 150 years of topping up at Hexham, there appears to be  of sunken ballast under the tracks. Chat Moss in the United Kingdom is similar.

Regular inspection of the ballast shoulder is important. As noted earlier, the lateral stability of the track depends upon the shoulder. The shoulder acquires some amount of stability over time, being compacted by traffic, but maintenance tasks such as replacing ties, tamping, and ballast cleaning can upset that stability. After performing those tasks, it is necessary either for trains to run at reduced speed on the repaired sections, or to employ machinery to compact the shoulder again.

If the trackbed becomes uneven, it is necessary to pack ballast underneath sunken ties to level the track again, which is usually done by a ballast tamping machine. A more recent, and probably better, technique is to lift the rails and ties, and to force stones, smaller than the track ballast particles and all of the same size, into the gap. That has the advantage of not disturbing the well-compacted ballast on the trackbed, which tamping is likely to do. The technique is called pneumatic ballast injection (PBI), or, less formally, "stoneblowing". However, it is not as effective with fresh ballast, because the smaller stones tend to move down between the larger pieces of ballast.

Quantities 

The quantity of ballast used tends to vary with gauge, with the wider gauges tending to have wider formations, although one report states that for a given load and speed, narrowing the gauge only slightly reduces the quantity of earthwork and ballast needed. The depth of ballast also tends to vary with the density of rail traffic, as faster and heavier traffic requires greater stability. The quantity of ballast also tends to increase over the years as more and more ballast is piled onto an existing roadbed. Some figures from an 1897 report listing requirements for light railways (usually narrower than standard gauge) are:

 first class line –  rail – .
 second class line –  rail – .
 third class line –  rail – .

See also

Ballastless track
Ballast tamper
Gandy dancer
Maintenance of way
Track maintenance

Footnotes

References

 
 
 
 
 
 

 
 International Federation for Structural Concrete (fédération internationale du béton) bulletin #37.

Further reading 
New South Wales: Ballast 1850-1987 Longworth, Jim Australian Railway History, December, 2004 pp443–462

External links

Photos of ballast cleaners in the UK
Photos of ballast regulators in the UK

Permanent way
Rail infrastructure